Brutally Live is a DVD of Alice Cooper's concert on 19 July 2000 at the Labatt's Hammersmith Apollo in London, England, released later in the same year. It was re-released in 2003 on DVD accompanied with an audio CD of an edited version of the DVD's soundtrack.

Track listing 
 "The Controler (Intro)" – 1:39
 "Brutal Planet" (Alice Cooper, Bob Marlette) – 4:52
 "Gimme" (Cooper, Marlette) – 4:52
 "Go to Hell" (Cooper, Dick Wagner, Bob Ezrin) – 3:42
 "Blow Me a Kiss" (Cooper, Marlette, Ezrin) – 3:06
 "I'm Eighteen" (Cooper, Michael Bruce, Glen Buxton, Dennis Dunaway. Neal Smith) – 4:28
 "Pick Up the Bones" (Cooper, Marlette) – 4:54
 "Feed My Frankenstein" (Cooper, Nick Coler, Ian Richardson, Zodiac Mindwarp) – 4:18
 "Wicked Young Man" (Cooper, Marlette) – 3:32
 "Dead Babies" (Cooper, Bruce, Buxton, Dunaway, Smith)  – 3:28
 "Ballad of Dwight Fry" (Cooper, Bruce) – 4:39
 "I Love the Dead" (Cooper, Ezrin) – 2:30
 "Devil's Food" (Cooper, Ezrin, Jay) – :47
 "The Black Widow" (Cooper, Wagner, Ezrin) – 3:52
 "No More Mr. Nice Guy" (Cooper, Bruce) – 4:23
 "It's Hot Tonight" (Cooper, Wagner, Ezrin) – 2:46
 "Caught in a Dream" (Bruce) – 2:28
 "It's the Little Things" (Cooper, Marlette) – 5:15
 "Poison" (Cooper, Desmond Child, John McCurry) – 4:53
 "Take It Like a Woman" (Cooper, Marlette) – 2:37
 "Only Women Bleed" (Cooper, Wagner) – 4:17
 "You Drive Me Nervous" (Cooper, Bruce, Ezrin) – 2:23
 "Under My Wheels" (Bruce, Dunaway, Ezrin) – 4:41
 "School's Out" (Cooper, Bruce, Buxton, Dunaway, Smith) – 4:41
 "Billion Dollar Babies" (Cooper, Bruce, Smith) – 2:26
 "My Generation" (Pete Townshend) – 1:28
 "Elected" (Cooper, Bruce, Buxton, Dunaway, Ezrin) – 4:49

Bonus video
 "Gimme"

CD track listing 
 Brutal Planet 6:30	
 Gimme 4:51	
 Go to Hell 3:41	
 Blow Me a Kiss 3:06	
 I'm Eighteen 4:20	
 Feed My Frankenstein 4:26	
 Wicked Young Man 3:30	
 No More Mr. Nice Guy 4:18	
 It's Hot Tonight 2:51	
 Caught in a Dream 2:26	
 It's the Little Things 5:16	
 Poison 4:53	
 Take It Like a Woman 2:37	
 Only Women Bleed 4:15	
 You Drive Me Nervous 2:23	
 Under My Wheels 4:45	
 School's Out 4:36	
 Billion Dollar Babies 2:24	
 My Generation 1:29	
 Elected 4:49

Personnel  
 Alice Cooper – lead vocals
 Ryan Roxie – guitar, backing vocals
 Pete Friesen – guitar, backing vocals
 Greg Smith (as Frosty) – bass, backing vocals
 Eric Singer – drums, vocal background
 Teddy Andreadis (as ZigZag) – keyboards, background vocals
 Calico Cooper – "The Nurse", "Whipdancer", backing vocals
 Pat Nowak – "The Controller", "Executioner", backing vocals
 Venus Barr – "Inspiration"
 Angella Grossi – "Temptation"
 Calvin Cooper – dancer
 Dave Barnard – director
 Robert Jess Roth – concert director
 Geoff Kempin – executive producer
 Terry Shand – executive producer
 Richard Leyland – producer
 Melissa Roy – associate producer
 Bob Marlette – digital editing
 Frank Daranjo – liner notes
 Curtis Evans – packaging

Certifications

References

Alice Cooper live albums
2000 live albums
2000 video albums
Live video albums
Albums recorded at the Hammersmith Apollo